Champadangar Bou was a Bengali drama film directed by Nirmal Dey. This film was based on the story of Tarashankar Bandyopadhyay. This movie was released on 1954 in the banner of Nirmal Dey Productions. The music direction was done by Manabendra Mukhopadhyay. This movie starring Uttam Kumar, Sabitri Chatterjee, Kanu Banerjee, Tulsi Chakraborty, and Anubha Gupta in the lead roles.

Plot
A money-minded man gets insecure when he hears a rumour about his dutiful wife and spendthrift brother. Soon, things go out of hand when his rage takes over.

Cast
 Sabitri Chatterjee 
 Uttam Kumar 
 Kanu Banerjee
 Tulsi Chakraborty 
 Anubha Gupta
 Kamala Adhikari
 Asha Devi
 Deben Bandopadhyay
 Premangshu Bose
 Ardhendu Mukherjee
 Kabita Sarkar

References

External links
 

1954 films
Bengali-language Indian films
1954 drama films
1950s Bengali-language films
Films based on works by Tarasankar Bandyopadhyay
Films directed by Nirmal Dey
Indian drama films
Indian black-and-white films